The pomato (a portmanteau of potato and tomato) is a grafted plant that is produced by grafting together a tomato plant and a potato plant, both of which are members of the Solanum genus in the Solanaceae (nightshade) family. Cherry tomatoes grow on the vine, while white potatoes grow in the soil from the same plant.

Background
The concept of grafting related potatoes and tomatoes so that both are produced on the same plant dates back to at least the early 19th century - 1833.

As with all grafts, this plant will not occur in nature and cannot be grown from seed, because the two parts of the plant remain genetically separate, and only rely on each other for nourishment and growth. Like most standard types of plant grafting, a small incision is made in the stem of both plants and they are strapped together. Once the cuts have healed and the plants are joined, the leafy top of the potato plant can be cut away and the roots of the tomato can be removed, leaving the leaves of the tomato plant to nourish the roots of the potato plant. The rootstock (potato) acts as a stable and healthy root system and the scions (tomato) are chosen for their fruit, flowers or leaves. The tomatoes should be ready to harvest after about 12 weeks during the summer months, the potatoes should be ready after the tomato leaves begin to die back, normally in early autumn. Grafting in this way can be used to produce many different related crops from the same plant, for example the growing popularity of 'Fruit salad' trees, which is a single tree that produces multiple types of citrus fruits, or a tree with a variety of fruits with stones (peach, plum etc.).

Benefits
Pomato plants have been seen as a new technology to make food production more efficient, as they maximize the number of crops that can be produced on a piece of land or in a small urban environment like a balcony. This has significant impacts on developing countries like Kenya, where farmers can save on space, time and labor without affecting the quality of their produce by growing pomato plants. In addition, grafting can improve resistance to bacteria, viruses and fungi, attract a more diverse group of pollinators and provide a sturdy trunk for delicate ornamental plants.

Commercial products 
Grafted pomato plants were launched in the United Kingdom in September 2013 by a horticultural mail-order company Thompson & Morgan, who sold pre-grafted plants branded as the "TomTato". The Incredible Edible nursery in New Zealand announced a "DoubleUP Potato Tom" in the same month. Thompson & Morgan claim that this is the first time the plant has been produced commercially, and director Paul Hansord describes originating the TomTato idea himself 15 years ago in the US, when visiting a garden where someone had planted a potato under a tomato as a joke.

In fiction 
 

 Pomatos play a central role in the 1969 book The Life and Extraordinary Adventures of Private Ivan Chonkin by Vladimir Voinovich, where a tomato/potato hybrid is invented by the book's antagonist, Gladyshev, but later eaten by a cow. The plant was called the 'Path to Socialism' or PATS.
 	
 In the Fallout series, a potato and tomato hybrid created by nuclear war called a "tato" can be found eaten by the player character.

References

Horticulture
Plant genetics
Vegetables
Tomatoes
Potatoes
1930 introductions